Siler City Municipal Airport  is a public use airport located three nautical miles (6 km) southwest of the central business district of Siler City, a town in Chatham County, North Carolina, United States. It is owned by the Town of Siler City. This airport is included in the National Plan of Integrated Airport Systems for 2011–2015, which categorized it as a general aviation facility.

Facilities and aircraft 
Siler City Municipal Airport covers an area of 92 acres (37 ha) at an elevation of 615 feet (187 m) above mean sea level. It has one runway designated 4/22 with an asphalt surface measuring 5,000 by 75 feet (1,524 x 23 m).

For the 12-month period ending August 6, 2009, the airport had 21,500 aircraft operations, an average of 58 per day: 95% general aviation and 5% military. At that time there were 24 aircraft based at this airport: 79% single-engine and 21% multi-engine.

References

External links 
 Cardinal Air, the fixed-base operator (FBO)
  at North Carolina DOT airport guide
 Aerial image as of February 1999 from USGS The National Map
 

Airports in North Carolina
Transportation in Chatham County, North Carolina